Soga Sambo (born 5 October 1985 in Kaduna) is a Nigerian football striker who presumably last played for the Sharks of Nigeria until their dissolution in 2016.

Career 
Sambo began his career by Pepsi Football Academy and moved in January 2002 to Côte d'Ivoire Premier Division club ASEC Mimosas, played for 1 year by the team before turning to Nigeria he signs a contract by Shooting Stars F.C. He played for 2 years by the team from Ibadan and moved in January 2006 for one year to Mamelodi Sundowns F.C. in the Premier Soccer League, the club from Pretoria elongated his contract not and he released the club and moved back to Nigeria, he signs a contract by Kwara United F.C. On 26 September 2008 he moved to Finland based Club FC Inter Turku.

International 
He was member of the Nigeria U-20 at 2005 FIFA World Youth Championship in Netherlands and won the Silver medal (Vice-Worldcup Winner). He won with Nigeria U-17 at 2001 FIFA U-17 World Championship in Trinidad and Tobago the Silver medal (Vice-Worldcup Winner).

Titles 
 2001 FIFA U-17 World Championship - Silver medal (Vice-Worldcup Winner)
 2005 FIFA World Youth Championship - Silver medal (Vice-Worldcup Winner)
 2008 Veikkausliiga Winner with FC Inter Turku

References

External links 
 

1985 births
Living people
Nigerian footballers
Nigerian expatriate footballers
Nigeria international footballers
Nigeria under-20 international footballers
Nigeria youth international footballers
ASEC Mimosas players
Shooting Stars S.C. players
Expatriate footballers in Finland
Nigerian expatriate sportspeople in South Africa
Mamelodi Sundowns F.C. players
FC Inter Turku players
Expatriate footballers in Ivory Coast
Veikkausliiga players
Expatriate soccer players in South Africa
Pepsi Football Academy players
Nigerian expatriate sportspeople in Finland
Kwara United F.C. players
Association football midfielders
Sportspeople from Kaduna